The Pakistan Ambassador to the Saudi Arabia is in charge of the Embassy of Pakistan, Riyadh, Saudi Arabia and Pakistan's diplomatic mission to the Kingdom of Saudi Arabia. The official title is Ambassador of the Islamic Republic of Pakistan to the Kingdom of Saudi Arabia.

Bilal Akbar is the current ambassador to the Saudi Arabia.

List of Pakistani Ambassadors to the Saudi Arabia

References

Saudi Arabia
Pakistan